Greatest Country Hits contains Glen Campbell's last four Country top ten hits from the 1980s ("The Hand That Rocks the Cradle", "Still within the Sound of My Voice", "I Have You" and "Gone, Gone, Gone") plus some other single and album tracks taken from his 1990 Liberty album Walkin' in the Sun together with three of his biggest hits from 1975–1977. His earliers hits are compiled on another Curb release called Best of the Early Years.

Track listing
 "She's Gone, Gone, Gone" (Harlan Howard) – 2:47
 "Somebody's Leaving" (Curly Putman, Don Cook, Rafe Van Hoy) – 2:05
 "Still Within The Sound Of My Voice" (Jimmy Webb) – 4:08
 "I Have You" (Gene Nelson, Paul Nelson) – 3:18
 "The Hand That Rocks The Cradle" (Ted Harris) – 3:14 (duet with Steve Wariner)
 "Southern Nights" (Allen Toussaint) – 2:58
 "Rhinestone Cowboy" (Larry Weiss) – 3:15
 "Walkin' In The Sun" (Jeff Barry) – 2:29
 "On A Good Night" (Jim Weatherly, Keith Stegall) – 3:23
 "If I Could Only Get My Hands On You Now" (Larry Gatlin) – 3:19
 "Country Boy (You Got Your Feet In LA)" (Dennis Lambert, Brian Potter) – 3:08

Production
Art direction – Neuman, Walker and Associates
Photography – Beverly Parker
Liner notes – Don Ovens

Track information and credits verified from the album's liner notes as well as from AllMusic.

References

1990 greatest hits albums
Glen Campbell compilation albums
Curb Records compilation albums